Hudson Valley is a regional-interest monthly magazine that covers the Hudson Valley. It began publishing in April, 1972, and works out of offices in Poughkeepsie, approximately in the center of its coverage area (Albany, Rensselaer, Columbia, Dutchess, Greene, Orange, Putnam, Rockland, Ulster and Westchester counties).

Articles in Hudson Valley are features and lifestyle pieces about residents, places, history, recreation, and dining opportunities in the region. They are accompanied by color photography and a lengthy event listing.

The magazine is a member of the City and Regional Magazine Association (CRMA).

References

External links
Hudson Valley magazine website

1971 establishments in New York (state)
Local interest magazines published in the United States
Monthly magazines published in the United States
Magazines established in 1971
Magazines published in New York (state)